

Thomas Dold (born September 10, 1984, in Wolfach, Baden-Württemberg) is a German track and field and extreme athlete and a tower runner, stair runner, world-record holding champion backwards runner.

Dold has competed a number of times in the most prestigious tower run of the world, the Empire State Building Run Up in New York. He first participated in 2005 and finished second. The next year he won the competition, the youngest competitor ever to do so. When he participated the third time on February 6, 2007, he was able to defend his title. In February 2008 he finished the run with his personal record time of 10 minutes, 8 seconds and won for the third time in a row. He followed it up with another win in 2009 in a time of 10 minutes and 6 seconds. On June 15, 2008, Thomas Dold won the tower run up 2,046 steps to the 91st level of Taipei 101, which was the highest skyscraper of the world at that time. It took him 10 minutes, 53 seconds.

Thomas Dold is also part of the world elite in backwards running, the so-called Retro-Running. His greatest success was winning two World Championship titles at any one time in 2006 in Rotkreuz/Switzerland and in 2008 in Pietrasanta/Italy. Currently he holds 5 world records in backwards running between 400 meters and a mile.

Athletic career

Stair running 

 2004: 2nd place Donauturm Run Up, Vienna
 2004: 1st place Uptown Run Up, Munich
 2005: 2nd place Empire State Building Run Up, New York City
 2005: 3rd place Donauturm Run Up, Vienna
 2006: 1st place Empire State Building Run Up, New York
 2006: 2nd place Taipei 101 Run Up, Taipei
 2006: 1st place Sky Run Berlin
 2006: 1st place Donauturm Run Up, Vienna
 2006: 1st place Fernsehturmlauf, Stuttgart
 2006: 1st place Towerruning, Basel
 2007: 1st place Empire State Building Run Up, New York
 2007: 2nd place Taipei 101 Run Up, Taipei
 2007: 1st place Sky Run, Berlin
 2007: 1st place Donauturm Run Up, Vienna
 2007: 1st place Fernsehturmlauf, Stuttgart
 2007: 2nd place Towerruning, Basel
 2008: 1st place Empire State Building Run Up, New York
 2008: 1st place Taipei 101 Run Up, Taipei
 2008: 1st place Swissotel Vertical Marathon, Singapore
 2008: 1st place Sky Run, Berlin
 2008: 1st place Fernsehturmlauf, Stuttgart
 2008: 1st place Pirelli Towerrun, Milan
 2008: 1st place Towerrun, Benidorm
 2009: 1st place Empire State Building Run Up, New York
 2009: 1st place Sydney Tower Run Up, Sydney (7 mins 4 seconds)
 2010: 1st place Empire State Building Run Up, New York
 2010: Withdraw the competition Torre Colpatria Run Up, Bogotá - Colombia
 2011: 1st place Empire State Building Run Up, New York
 2011: 1st place SkyRun, Frankfurt
 2011: 1st place Bitexco Vertical Run, Ho Chi Minh
 2012: 1st place Empire State Building Run Up, New York
 2013: 1st place China World Summit Wing Hotel Vertical Run, Beijing
 2013: 1st place Hanoi Vertical Run, Hanoi, Vietnam
 2015: 1st place Hanoi Vertical Run, Hanoi, Vietnam

Backward running 
 2004: German Backward Running champion
 2005: German Backward Running champion
 2006: Backward Running World Champion (400 and 3000 meters)
 2008: Backward Running World Champion (400 and 3000 meters)

Backward running world records
 2003: 1000 meters (3:32.35, broken in 2008)
 2004: 800 meters (2:40.00, broken in 2008)
 2005: 400 meters (1:09.56)
 2006: 1500 meters (5:24.00)
 2008: 1000 meters (3:20.09)
 2008: 800 meters (2:31.30)
 2015: 10 km (39:20)

External links
 Thomas Dold's Website 
 Report from ARD regarding Dold's Empire State Building Run Up win in 2006 
 Spiegel Video Report 

1984 births
Living people
People from Wolfach
Sportspeople from Freiburg (region)
German male sprinters
Tower runners